Angels & Demons is a mystery-thriller novel by Dan Brown released in 2000.

Angels & Demons, Angels and Demons, Demons & Angels, or Demons and Angels may also refer to:

Music
Angels and Demons at Play, 1965 jazz album by Sun Ra and his Myth Science Arkestra recorded in 1956 and 1960
Angels & Demons (album), by Peter Andre, released 2012
"Angels & Demons" (Tamar Braxton song), by Tamar Braxton off of her 2015 album Calling All Lovers
Angels & Demons, a joint musical project by Chris Brown and Joyner Lucas

Film
Angels and Demons (1970 film), a Brazilian film
Angels & Demons (film), the 2009 adaptation of the Dan Brown novel

Television
"Demons and Angels", fifth episode of Series V of Red Dwarf in 1992
"Angels and Demons" (Blade: The Series episode), Episode 1.09 of Blade: The Series in 2006
"Angels & Demons", title of 8th episode of the TV series Agent X in 2015
 "Angels and Demons: Cold Case Anonymous", a 2015 Japanese mini-series on TV Asahi

See also
Angels & Devils (disambiguation)
Angel
Demon
Fallen angel